In mathematics, Steinhaus–Moser notation is a notation for expressing certain large numbers. It is an extension (devised by Leo Moser) of Hugo Steinhaus's polygon notation.

Definitions 
 a number  in a triangle means nn.

 a number  in a square is equivalent to "the number  inside  triangles, which are all nested."

 a number  in a pentagon is equivalent with "the  number  inside  squares, which are all nested."

etc.:  written in an -sided polygon is equivalent with "the  number  inside  nested -sided polygons". In a series of nested polygons, they are associated inward. The number  inside two triangles is equivalent to nn inside one triangle, which is equivalent to nn raised to the power of nn.

Steinhaus defined only the triangle, the square, and the circle , which is equivalent to the pentagon defined above.

Special values 
Steinhaus defined:
mega is the number equivalent to 2 in a circle: 
megiston is the number equivalent to 10 in a circle: ⑩

Moser's number is the number represented by "2 in a megagon". Megagon is here the name of a polygon with "mega" sides (not to be confused with the polygon with one million sides).

Alternative notations:
use the functions square(x) and triangle(x)
let  be the number represented by the number  in  nested -sided polygons; then the rules are:

 and
mega = 
megiston = 
moser =

Mega
A mega, ②, is already a very large number, since ② =
square(square(2)) = square(triangle(triangle(2))) =
square(triangle(22)) = 
square(triangle(4)) =
square(44) =
square(256) =
triangle(triangle(triangle(...triangle(256)...)))  [256 triangles] =
triangle(triangle(triangle(...triangle(256256)...)))  [255 triangles] ~
triangle(triangle(triangle(...triangle(3.2 × 10616)...)))  [254 triangles] =
...

Using the other notation:

mega = M(2,1,5) = M(256,256,3)

With the function  we have mega =  where the superscript denotes a functional power, not a numerical power.

We have (note the convention that powers are evaluated from right to left):
M(256,2,3) = 
M(256,3,3) = ≈
Similarly:
M(256,4,3) ≈ 
M(256,5,3) ≈ 
M(256,6,3) ≈ 
etc.

Thus:
mega = , where  denotes a functional power of the function .

Rounding more crudely (replacing the 257 at the end by 256), we get mega ≈ , using Knuth's up-arrow notation.

Using base 10 powers we get:

 ( is added to the 616)

...
mega = , where  denotes a functional power of the function . Hence

Moser's number

It has been proven that in Conway chained arrow notation,

and, in Knuth's up-arrow notation,

Therefore, Moser's number, although incomprehensibly large, is vanishingly small compared to Graham's number:

See also 
 Ackermann function

References

External links
 Robert Munafo's Large Numbers
 Factoid on Big Numbers
Megistron at mathworld.wolfram.com (Steinhaus referred to this number as "megiston" with no "r".)
Circle notation at mathworld.wolfram.com
Steinhaus-Moser Notation - Pointless Large Number Stuff

Mathematical notation
Large numbers